The Phantom of 42nd Street is a 1945 American mystery film directed by Albert Herman and starring Dave O'Brien, Kay Aldridge and Alan Mowbray. It was produced by the low-budget Poverty Row studio Producers Releasing Corporation. The film's sets were designed by the art director Paul Palmentola.

Plot 
An actor is killed during the performance of a play while critic Tony Woolrich (Dave O'Brien) is attending. Initially Woolrich is reluctant to investigate, even though he's encouraged to do so by his friend Romeo (Frank Jenks), who is also the taxi driver who brought him to the show, and acts as a sort of sidekick throughout the story.

Tony is chewed out by his editor for not investigating when he happened to be at the scene of the crime, and so he takes an initially reluctant interest. Tony becomes more involved in the investigation when there is another murder, and when Claudia Moore (Kay Aldridge, in her last movie role), the girl he loves, is suspected, and is also possibly threatened by the killer.

Cast 
Dave O'Brien as Tony Woolrich
Kay Aldridge as Claudia Moore
Alan Mowbray as Cecil Moore
Frank Jenks as Egbert "Romeo" Egelhofer, taxi driver
Edythe Elliott as Jane Buchanan
Jack Mulhall as Lt. Walsh
Vera Marshe as Ginger
Stanley Price as Reggie Thomas/The Phantom
John Crawford as John Carraby
Cyril Delevanti as Roberts
Paul Power as Timothy Wells
Budd Buster as Mike, stage doorman
Pat Gleason as Reporter
Milton Kibbee as Peters, newspaper editor
Harry Strang as Policeman
Robert Strange as Soothsayer in Play

References

Bibliography
 Fetrow, Alan G. Feature Films, 1940-1949: a United States Filmography. McFarland, 1994.

External links 

1945 films
American mystery films
American black-and-white films
The Phantom of the Opera
Producers Releasing Corporation films
Films set in New York City
1945 mystery films
Films scored by Karl Hajos
Films directed by Albert Herman
1940s English-language films
1940s American films